1 Bentinck Street is a grade II listed house in Bentinck Street, in the City of Westminster, London. The house was completed around 1800. It is on the corner with Welbeck Street.

References

External links 

Grade II listed buildings in the City of Westminster
Residential buildings completed in 1800
Welbeck Street